The Cupids is Thai lakorn series consists of 8 dramas, Kammathep Hunsa, Kamathep Ork Suek, Kamathep Online, Loob Korn Kammathep, Sorn Ruk Kammathep, Kammathep Sorn Kol, Kammathep Jum Laeng, and Kamathep Prab Marn. The television series is based on the novel series of the same name written by Isaya, Umariga, Romkaew, Shayna, Sornklin, Kaotam, Praenut, and Nara.

The series was produced by Broadcast Thai Television with 7 different directors. It was aired every Friday–Sunday from March 5 until July 23, 2017.

Synopsis 
4 years ago, Peem (Theeradej Wongpuapan) founded the company called "Cupid Hut", a matchmaking company with 8 female employees in different departments that help him run the company. In the present day, Peem found out that "Cupid Hut" does not reach the income target. Peem thought that because of the 8 female employees who are all still single and the clients find it hard to trust them in matchmaking as they are single themselves. On Valentine's Day, Peem called his 8 female employees on an urgent meeting and found that they all have problems when it comes to love. In order to save the company, Peem "orders" all eight of his employees to find a boyfriend before the next Valentine's Day. Anyone who can find a boyfriend will receive a bonus of 1 million baht in bonus. If his employees refuse to accept the order, the company will have to shut down, and all 8 of his female employees will have to part ways. And they will no longer work in the company that they love.

Broadcast order

References

External links 
 Ch3 Thailand Official Website
 Ch3 Thailand Official YouTube

2010s Thai television series
Thai drama television series
2017 Thai television series debuts
2017 Thai television series endings
Thai television soap operas
Channel 3 (Thailand) original programming
Television series by Broadcast Thai Television